Materum may refer to:

 Materum (surname), a surname among people of Filipino descent.
 Materum, Nigeria, a city in the eastern half of Nigeria
 Materum Hill, aka Matarum Hill, a hill in Nigeria